RTÉ Radio is a division of the Irish national broadcasting organisation Raidió Teilifís Éireann. RTÉ Radio broadcasts four analogue channels and five digital channels nationwide.

Founded in January 1926 as 2RN, the first broadcaster in the Irish Free State, in 1933 the service became Radio Athlone (Irish Raidió Áth Luain) and in 1938 was renamed as Radio Éireann. In 1966, after launching a television service, it became Raidió Teilifís Éireann, or RTÉ.

RTÉ Radio is, like its television parent, a statutory body, overseen by a board appointed by the Government of Ireland, with general management in the hands of the RTÉ Executive Board, headed by the Director-General. RTÉ Radio is regulated by the Broadcasting Authority of Ireland.

Channels and availability

History

The first voice broadcast of 2RN, the original radio callsign for what would eventually become RTÉ Radio 1, took place on 14 November 1925 when Seamus Clandillon, the station director, announced on air: "Seo Raidió 2RN, Baile Átha Cliath ag tástáil", Irish for "This is Radio 2RN, Dublin testing". Regular Irish radio broadcasting began on 1 January 1926. However, people in most of Ireland could not receive 2RN's (1.5 kilowatt) signal at the time. When faced with numerous complaints from Cork regarding the writers' inability to tune in to the signal, Clandillon remarked in The Irish Radio Review, a magazine dedicated to the service, that they did not know how to operate their sets. A second station, 6CK (mostly relaying the transmissions of 2RN), was established in Cork in 1927.

A high power (initially 60 kW) station was established in Athlone, in 1932, to coincide with the staging of the Eucharistic Congress. 2RN, 6CK and Athlone became known as "Radio Athlone" or, in Irish, "Raidió Áth Luain" and were receivable across virtually the entire country. Radio Athlone was officially renamed "Radio Éireann" in 1938.

Radio Éireann had limited programming hours and a conservative programming policy. It was barely tolerated by some Irish listeners, and was often shunned in favour of BBC stations and Radio Luxembourg. This changed when Radio Éireann became free of direct government control in the 1960s.

In June 1969, work had begun on the new Radio Centre at Donnybrook. Construction of the building was finished in April 1971 and after a period of fitting-out and transition, live broadcasts began on 24 September 1973. By May 1974 the move from the GPO in O'Connell Street, (which had been the home of Irish radio since 1928), was complete.

A pop music channel, RTÉ Radio 2 (renamed RTÉ 2fm in 1988), began broadcasting on 31 May 1979, founded in response to the growth of pirate radio channels.

An Irish language channel, Raidió na Gaeltachta, began broadcasting on 2 April 1972; RnaG has grown to become an influential news, music and spoken word service.

RTÉ lyric fm serves the interests of classical music and the arts, coming on air in May 1999, and replacing FM3 Classical Music, which had catered for the same target audience and time-shared with Raidió na Gaeltachta.

Now, RTÉ has a nationwide communications network with an increasing emphasis on regional news-gathering and input. Broadcasting on RTÉ Radio 1 provides comprehensive coverage of news, current affairs, music, drama and variety features, agriculture, education, religion and sport, mostly in English but also some Irish. RTÉ 2fm is a popular music and chat channel. RTÉ lyric fm serves the interests of classical music and the arts, replacing FM3 Classical Music, which had catered for the same target audience and time-shared with Raidió na Gaeltachta.

RTÉ-operated RTÉ Radio Cork (previously 'Cork 89FM' and 'RTÉ Cork Local Radio'), a local radio service in Cork. This closed in January 2000. Listen to recording from 1994 of the Cork station.

Digital Radio and DAB

RTÉ Radio is streamed on the Internet and broadcast digitally on Saorview digital terrestrial television, on Virgin Media Ireland digital cable services, on the Saorsat satellite services (Spot beam on Eutelsat KA-SAT 9E) and core FM channels are available on Astra 2E @ 28.2°E, where they can be found in the Sky and Freesat EPGs or tuned manually at 11914 H 27500 5/6. Between 2006 and 2021, RTE Radio was also broadcast via DAB.

RTÉ had operated multiplex 1 (block 12C) on the Irish digital radio platform (DAB). The broadcaster launched nine digital-only channels in May 2007, as part of a trial to assess if demand existed for new radio services. This ran alongside a brief commercial radio trial MUX in some areas, which did not continue beyond the trial phase.

On 30 November 2008 the trial ended and a permanent service was introduced. RTÉ officially launched six stations: RTÉ 2XM, RTÉ Chill/RTÉ Junior (timeshare), RTÉ Choice, RTÉ Gold, and RTÉ Pulse and RTÉ Radio 1 Extra.

Two of the trial stations were not continued. RTÉ Digital Radio News, which played the most recent Radio 1 news bulletin on loop and RTÉ Playback, a listen back service with content from Radio 1 and 2fm did not form part of the official launch.

RTÉ Radio 1 Extra also continued to be broadcast, providing extra programming, such as sports coverage often broadcast only on the RTÉ Radio 1 Long Wave (AM) service.

Approximately 44% of the country was able to receive RTÉ DAB service. It was never extended nationally to all areas serviced by FM. Transmitters provided DAB coverage focused on three cities: Dublin, Limerick and Cork and parts of the Northeast.

On 6 November 2019, RTÉ management announced that, as part of a major cost-saving program, all of its digital radio stations would be closed.

RTÉ ceased broadcasting using DAB on 31 March 2021. However, its digital-only channels remain available as online streaming services and though the Saorview DTT service and on Virgin Media Ireland digital cable TV.

RTÉ's digital radio stations continue to be broadcast on Saorview Digital Terrestrial TV, Virgin Media Ireland cable and core services are carried on satellite television platforms on Astra 28.2°E and are included in the Sky and Freesat EPGs. All services remain available streaming online, accessible through the RTÉ website and many online radio platforms, including smart speaker services.

FM frequencies

Main transmission sites

Longwave
RTÉ Radio One is relayed on longwave.

Shortwave
RTÉ from time to time broadcasts on the Shortwave bands aimed at the Irish Diaspora, for example, the RTÉ Radio One coverage of GAA All-Ireland Finals in recent years.
RTÉ Broadcasts one hour a day.

Special frequencies for GAA All-Ireland Finals 
The Meyerton transmitter site in South Africa was used to relay this 17540 kHz in 2012.

See also
 Raidió Teilifís Éireann
 Ulysses (broadcast)

References

External links

 
Radio stations in the Republic of Ireland
Radio stations in Northern Ireland